No Child Left Unplugged (NOCU) was a San Francisco based non-profit organization founded by Corey Linehan with the purpose of teaching technology skills at economically challenged schools as well as providing computers for such schools.

History
Corey Linehan, a student of Stuart Hall High School founded No Child Left Unplugged in the Spring of 2005, with the initial pilot program launching in the fall of 2007.

See also
One Laptop per Child

References

External links
 The website of NOCU

Non-profit organizations based in San Francisco
Digital divide
Educational foundations in the United States